Sentosa Cove is a residential enclave in the eastern part of Sentosa Island in Singapore, which is planned to include about 2,500 units when fully expanded. It is largely made up of reclaimed land. The master developer of the site was Sentosa Cove Pte. Ltd., a subsidiary of Sentosa Development Corporation, which purchased the site from the Singapore Land Authority for about S$800 million.

About 60% of property buyers in Sentosa Cove are foreigners.

Attractions
There are multiple attractions found in the Sentosa Cove enclave, including hotels and F&B outlets.

Hotels
ONE°15 Marina Sentosa Cove, Singapore - A boutique 26-room hotel situated by the marina at Sentosa Cove. It is also a members' club and is the point of contact for berthing at the Sentosa Cove marina.
W. Singapore, Sentosa Cove - A 240-room five-star luxury resort hotel known for providing a variety of services & facilities including the Whatever/Whenever service. The property is connected to a 228-unit residential complex (W. Residences) located at Quayside Isle.

Spas
Spa Rael - Situated within ONE°15 Marina Sentosa Cove
AWAY Spa - Situated within W. Singapore

Food & Beverages
There is a wide variety of food and beverage options available at Sentosa Cove, notably along Quayside Isle, the enclave's upscale waterfront shopping centre. This includes:
Boaters' Bar
Blue Lotus - Chinese Eating House
Gin Khao Bistro
Greenwood Fish Market
Joe & The Juice
Miska Cafe
Mykonos on the Bay
Rock Bar - Burger & Steakhouse
Sabio by the Sea - Tapas Bar & Grill
SolePomodoro Trattoria Pizzeria
Two Chefs Bar
WOK°15 Kitchen, situated within ONE°15 Marina Sentosa Cove

References

External links
Official website of Sentosa Cove

Sentosa